is a railway station located in the city of Aomori, Aomori Prefecture, Japan, operated by  the East Japan Railway Company (JR East)

Lines

Station layout
The station  has one side platform and one island platform serving three tracks, connected to the station building by a footbridge. The station is unattended.

Platforms

Note: Track 3 is used primarily for freight trains changing direction.

History
Daishaka Station was opened on December 1, 1894 as a station on the Japanese Government Railways, the predecessor to the Japan National Railway (JNR) in former Namioka village. With the privatization of the JNR on April 1, 1987, it came under the operational control of JR East. A new station building was completed in July 2007.

Surrounding area

 Daishaka Post Office

See also
 List of Railway Stations in Japan

External links

 

Stations of East Japan Railway Company
Railway stations in Aomori Prefecture
Ōu Main Line
Aomori (city)
Railway stations in Japan opened in 1894